The Sea is an album by Norwegian pianist Ketil Bjørnstad, released in 1995 on the ECM label.

Reception
Writing for Allmusic, Scott Yanow awarded the album 4½ out of 5 stars, stating "The music is generally mournful, full of space, floating and very much a soundtrack for one's thoughts... Some listeners may enjoy its introspective and peaceful nature of these performances but most will find this a bit of a bore."

Track listing

Personnel
Ketil Bjørnstad - piano
Terje Rypdal - guitar
David Darling - cello
Jon Christensen - drums

References

1995 albums
ECM Records albums
Ketil Bjørnstad albums
Albums produced by Manfred Eicher